Bok is a lunar impact crater that is located on the far side of the Moon. To the southeast is the crater Sniadecki; to the north is McKellar, and further to the west is De Vries.

The rim of Bok is well-defined and is not significantly eroded. The inner walls slope gently down to the nearly level interior floor, which has a central peak near the midpoint. There is a slight inward bulge along the northwest wall.

Satellite craters
By convention these features are identified on lunar maps by placing the letter on the side of the crater midpoint that is closest to Bok.

References

 
 
 
 
 
 
 
 
 
 
 
 

Impact craters on the Moon